The Chairman of the Legislative Assembly of Vologda Oblast is the presiding officer of that legislature.

Chairmen

Sources 

Lists of legislative speakers in Russia
Politics of Vologda Oblast